Henry George Lackner (December 25, 1851 – 1925) was an Ontario doctor and political figure. He represented Waterloo North in the Legislative Assembly of Ontario as a Conservative member in 1898 and again from 1903 to 1912.

He was born in Hawkesville, Canada West, the son of William Lackner, a German immigrant. He was educated in Waterloo County and taught school for four years before going on to study at the Toronto School of Medicine. Lackner was licensed as a physician in 1876 and set up practice in Berlin (later Kitchener). In 1886, he was elected mayor and was reelected the following year and again in 1893. Lackner also served as medical health officer for Berlin. In 1880, he married Helen A. Mackie. He was elected to the provincial assembly in 1898 but unseated after an appeal and did not run in the by-election that followed; he later served four terms in the assembly. He resigned his seat in 1912 when he was named sheriff for Waterloo County; he served in that post until his death in 1925. He was buried at Mount Hope Cemetery in Kitchener.

References 

 Canadian Parliamentary Guide, 1910, EJ Chambers

External links 
Member's parliamentary history for the Legislative Assembly of Ontario
The Canadian album : Men of Canada; or, Success by example ..., W Cochrane (1891)
A History of Kitchener, Ontario, WV Uttley (1937) 

1851 births
1925 deaths
Mayors of Kitchener, Ontario
Progressive Conservative Party of Ontario MPPs
Burials at Mount Hope Cemetery, Kitchener, Ontario